Prath is a municipality in the district of Rhein-Lahn, in Rhineland-Palatinate, in western Germany.

References

Rhein-Lahn-Kreis